Bryopsidaceae is a family of green algae, in the order Bryopsidales.

References

Ulvophyceae families
Bryopsidales